Edward Dewayne Douglas (December 22, 1931 – April 11, 2000) was an American football offensive tackle who played one season with the New York Giants of the National Football League (NFL). He was drafted by the New York Giants in the fourth round of the 1953 NFL Draft. He played college football for the University of Florida and attended Kissimmee High School in Kissimmee, Florida.

College career
Douglas attended the University of Florida from 1949 to 1952, where he played for coach Bob Woodruff's Florida Gators football team. As a senior lineman on the Gators' first bowl team in 1952, he was a third-team All-Southeastern Conference (SEC) selection by the Associated Press.

Professional career
Douglas was selected by the New York Giants of the NFL with the 44th pick in the 1953 NFL Draft and played in ten games for the team during the 1953 season.

Coaching career
Douglas coached the freshmen football team at the University of Florida for six years. He was the head football coach and athletic director of Osceola High School in Kissimmee, Florida.  He was also the head football coach at Suwannee High School in Live Oak, Florida. During his time as an assistant coach for the Florida Gators, it was his questions about player urination and dehydration that led to the development of Gatorade by a team of University of Florida medical researchers, including Robert Cade.

Personal life
Douglas worked at the Container Corporation of America for twenty years. He was a member of the University of Florida Police Department.

References

External links
 Just Sports Stats

1931 births
2000 deaths
American football tackles
Florida Gators football coaches
Florida Gators football players
New York Giants players
High school football coaches in Florida
People from Kissimmee, Florida
Sportspeople from Greater Orlando
Players of American football from Florida